Aliabad (also Romanized as ‘Alīābād) is a village in Howmeh Rural District, in the Central District of Andimeshk County, Khuzestan Province, Iran. At the 2006 census, its population was 505, in 111 families.

References 

Populated places in Andimeshk County